James Steven Stirling (born November 19, 1949) is a scout with the Ottawa Senators of the National Hockey League. He is the former head coach of the American Hockey League's Norfolk Admirals, the Springfield Falcons and the National Hockey League's New York Islanders.

Career
Before coaching the Norfolk Admirals to their worst finish in franchise history, Stirling spent a season and a half as coach of the New York Islanders before his dismissal in January 2006, though he led the Islanders to an impressive record of 38–29–11–4 in his first season as an NHL head coach. In the NHL playoffs, the Islanders were beaten by the eventual Stanley Cup-winning Tampa Bay Lightning in five games.

Stirling has also played centre for various teams in the NCAA, AHL and NAHL. He has previously served as head coach of the Bridgeport Sound Tigers, Springfield Falcons, Babson College and Providence College and as assistant coach of the Islanders and the Lowell Lock Monsters. While in college, Stirling never had a losing season. He is also one of the few people to coach at three different levels of NCAA hockey.

After the disappointing season with the Admirals, general manager Jay Feaster announced that Stirling would not be the coach heading into the 2008–09 AHL season. Stirling was given a job as a scout for the team. On June 16, 2008, the German DEL club Iserlohn Roosters announced that Stirling had signed a two-year contract as its head coach. After 44 games and an 0–6 series, he was dismissed by the Roosters on February 5, 2009.

Stirling was signed as an assistant coach of the Binghamton Senators (the Ottawa Senators' farm team) in 2009. The Binghamton Senators won the AHL's Calder Cup one season later.

Personal
Stirling is the father of former minor-league goaltender Scott Stirling.

Head-coaching record

College

NHL

Awards and honors

References

External links
 

1949 births
Living people
AHCA Division I men's ice hockey All-Americans
Boston Braves (AHL) players
Boston University Terriers men's ice hockey players
Canadian ice hockey coaches
Canadian ice hockey forwards
Ice hockey people from Toronto
NCAA men's ice hockey national champions
New York Islanders coaches
Ottawa Senators scouts
Providence Friars men's ice hockey coaches
Rochester Americans players
Springfield Falcons coaches